The Bradley's miner bee (Andrena bradleyi) is a species of miner bee in the family Andrenidae. Another common name for this species is Bradley's andrena. It is found in North America.

References

Further reading

External links

 

andrenoides
Articles created by Qbugbot
Insects described in 1907
Hymenoptera of North America